Steginoporella is a genus of bryozoans belonging to the family Steginoporellidae.

The genus has cosmopolitan distribution.

Species:

Steginoporella alaica 
Steginoporella altavillae 
Steginoporella alveolata 
Steginoporella arabica 
Steginoporella asymetrica 
Steginoporella auriculata 
Steginoporella bassleri 
Steginoporella bassleri 
Steginoporella bhujensis 
Steginoporella buskii 
Steginoporella caumontensis 
Steginoporella cavatura 
Steginoporella cellariiformis 
Steginoporella chartacea 
Steginoporella chiplonkari 
Steginoporella cliftonensis 
Steginoporella connexa 
Steginoporella corioensis 
Steginoporella cornuta 
Steginoporella crassa 
Steginoporella crassopora 
Steginoporella cucullata 
Steginoporella cylindrica 
Steginoporella defixa 
Steginoporella delicata 
Steginoporella dennanti 
Steginoporella dilatata 
Steginoporella discors 
Steginoporella elegans 
Steginoporella evelinae 
Steginoporella firma 
Steginoporella firma 
Steginoporella fragilis 
Steginoporella greavesi 
Steginoporella haddoni 
Steginoporella haidingeri 
Steginoporella hexagonalis 
Steginoporella iberica 
Steginoporella immanis 
Steginoporella incrustans 
Steginoporella intermedia 
Steginoporella jacksonica 
Steginoporella jamaicensis 
Steginoporella laevimarginata 
Steginoporella lateralis 
Steginoporella lineata 
Steginoporella magnifica 
Steginoporella magnilabris 
Steginoporella mandibulata 
Steginoporella manzonii 
Steginoporella marcusi 
Steginoporella mathuri 
Steginoporella mediterranea 
Steginoporella modesta 
Steginoporella montenati 
Steginoporella murachbanensis 
Steginoporella neozelanica 
Steginoporella obtusa 
Steginoporella parvicella 
Steginoporella perplexa 
Steginoporella pirabensis 
Steginoporella porteri 
Steginoporella reingruberhohensis 
Steginoporella rhodanica 
Steginoporella rhomboidalis 
Steginoporella simplex 
Steginoporella sulcata 
Steginoporella tiara 
Steginoporella transversalis 
Steginoporella triangularis 
Steginoporella truncata 
Steginoporella tuberculata 
Steginoporella tubulosa 
Steginoporella turbarens 
Steginoporella vicksburgica

References

Bryozoan genera